was a Japanese diplomat and the Director General of the International Atomic Energy Agency (IAEA) (July 2009 – 2019). Amano previously served as an international civil servant for the United Nations and its subdivisions.

Early life
Amano was born in Yugawara, a small town in Kanagawa Prefecture, Japan, in 1947. He started his studies at the University of Tokyo in 1968. After graduating from the Faculty of Law, he joined the Ministry of Foreign Affairs in April 1972. He specialized in the international disarmament issue and nuclear nonproliferation efforts. In 1973–1974, he studied at the University of Franche-Comté and in 1974–1975, at the University of Nice, France.

Career

Japanese Ministry of Foreign Affairs
Amano held different posts in the foreign ministry such as the Director of the Science Division and Director of the Nuclear Energy Division in 1993. As a member of the Diplomatic service, he was posted in the Embassies of Japan in Vientiane, Washington and Brussels, in the Delegation of Japan to the Conference on Disarmament in Geneva and was Consul General of Japan in Marseille.

In August 2002, he was appointed Director-General for Arms Control and Scientific Affairs, and in August 2004, he was appointed Director-General of the Disarmament, Nonproliferation and Science Department. In these positions, he was involved in international negotiations such as the Nuclear Non-Proliferation Treaty extension; the Comprehensive Nuclear-Test-Ban Treaty; the Biological Weapons Convention verification protocol; amendment of the Convention on Certain Conventional Weapons and the International Code of Conduct against Ballistic Missile Proliferation. He represented Japan as a governmental expert on the UN Panel on Missiles in April 2001 and in the UN Expert Group on Disarmament and Nonproliferation Education in July 2001.

International Atomic Energy Agency

In 2005, Amano served as the ambassador from Japan to the IAEA. From September 2005 to September 2006, Amano served as the Chairman of the IAEA Board of Governors. During this time, the IAEA and its Director General Mohamed ElBaradei received the Nobel Peace Prize. Amano represented the IAEA as the chairman at the Nobel Prize award ceremony held in December 2005.

In September 2008, the Japanese government announced that it had nominated Yukiya Amano to be the next Director General of the IAEA. On 2 July 2009, he was elected by the Board of Governors as Director General for the IAEA in the sixth round of voting. He defeated South African representative Abdul Samad Minty, his primary rival. On 3 July 2009 all 145 IAEA member states formally appointed Yukiya Amano "by acclamation".

On 1 December 2009, Amano began his first term as Director General of the International Atomic Energy Agency.

In November 2010, British newspaper The Guardian reported on a U.S. diplomatic cable originating a year earlier in Vienna and supplied to the newspaper by WikiLeaks, detailing a meeting between Amano and an American ambassador. The author of the cable summarized a statement by Amano in which the latter offered that he "was solidly in the U.S. court on every key strategic decision, from high-level personnel appointments to the handling of Iran's alleged nuclear weapons program." In March 2012, Amano was accused by several former senior IAEA officials of pro-western bias, over-reliance on unverified intelligence and of sidelining sceptics.

Views on nuclear proliferation
In an interview mid-2009 with the Austrian newspaper Die Presse, Yukiya Amano said he was "resolute in opposing the spread of nuclear arms because I am from a country that experienced Hiroshima and Nagasaki".

Views on nuclear power
Yukiya Amano said, at the Center for Energy Sustainability and Economics' Nuclear Power Forum, "it is vital that concerns regarding safety and security are addressed. Safety and security are primarily the responsibility of each sovereign state. However, the IAEA has a strong role to play, because an accident or malicious act may have far-reaching and cross-border consequences."

According to Amano, "(t)here has been a very significant improvement in the efficient and safe performance of the nuclear industry in the past two decades. This reflects factors including improved design, better operating procedures, a strengthened and more effective regulatory environment and the emergence of a strong safety culture. The IAEA promotes an integrated approach to nuclear safety, focusing on management systems, effective leadership and safety culture. It is important that countries' safety and security infrastructures keep pace with developments in all areas of nuclear science and technology. We must never be complacent."

Official visit to the Philippines

On 10 December 2010, at the opening session of the Nuclear Power Forum organised by Center for Energy Sustainability and Economics and Arc Media Global, Amano said that the IAEA has "provided assistance in strengthening the country´s capabilities in nuclear science and technology and energy planning" as well as "advice on developing a Human Resource Development Plan for Nuclear Energy." At the Forum, Amano said the Philippines "plays an important role at the global level, for example by chairing the Review Conference of the Treaty on the Non-Proliferation of Nuclear Weapons." The Philippines assumed presidency of the Nuclear Non-Proliferation Treaty Review Conference in May 2010, which discussed peaceful use of nuclear energy, non-proliferation, and disarmament of nations developing nuclear weapons. Amano also visited the Bataan Nuclear Power Plant on 11 December 2010, during the Forum's second day. According to the Philippine Department of Foreign Affairs, the IAEA can assess the possible rehabilitation of the plant. During Amano's official visit, he held meetings with Foreign Affairs Secretary Alberto Romulo, Science and Technology Secretary Mario Montejo and Energy Secretary Jose Rene Almendras. The Philippine government is also looking at expanding its cooperation with the IAEA in training health professionals in the use of cancer radiotherapy.

Involvement in nuclear emergency after Japanese earthquake and tsunami
After the Fukushima I nuclear accidents on 11 March 2011, Amano held a meeting with Prime Minister Naoto Kan in Tokyo on 18 March. Amano, "who had just arrived from the agency's headquarters ... said he would dispatch a team 'within days' to monitor radiation near the damaged plant." At the meeting, Amano said Kan "agreed on the necessity to disclose as much information as possible on the unfolding nuclear crisis in Fukushima. 'What's important is coordination with international society and better transparency,' Mr. Amano told reporters before the meeting."

Personal life
Amano was married and spoke English and French in addition to his native Japanese. He died on 18 July 2019 at the age of 72. Associated Press reported the cause of death as cancer.

Awards and honors
:
 Grand Cordon of Order of the Rising Sun (2019, posthumous)
:
 Medal "25 Years of Independence of the Republic of Kazakhstan" (2017)

Other honors
On 5 June 2020, IAEA opened the Yukiya Amano Laboratories in honor of him. Located at the outskirts of Vienna, the building houses three of the five laboratories run jointly by the IAEA and the UN's Food and Agriculture Organization (FAO).

Publications
"A Japanese View on Nuclear Disarmament", The Non-Proliferation Review, 2002
"The Significance of the NPT Extension", Future Restraints on Arms Proliferation, 1996
"La Non-Prolifération Nucléaire en Extrême-Orient", Proliferation et Non-Proliferation Nucleaire, 1995
"Sea Dumping of Liquid Radioactive Waste by Russia", Gaiko Jiho, 1994

See also
Nuclear Security Summit (2010) (attended)

References

External links

 IAEA Director General's Corner

1947 births
2019 deaths
Directors General of the International Atomic Energy Agency
Japanese diplomats
Japanese expatriates in Austria
Nuclear proliferation
People associated with nuclear power
People from Kanagawa Prefecture
Japanese officials of the United Nations
University of Tokyo alumni
University of Franche-Comté alumni
Deaths from cancer in Austria
Grand Cordons of the Order of the Rising Sun